M1, M01 or M-1 may refer to:

Arts, entertainment & media 
 WD-M01 Turn A Gundam, a mecha from the anime Turn A Gundam
 M-1 (rapper), one half of hip hop duo Dead Prez
 Korg M1, a keyboard synthesizer
 Leica M1, a 1959 35 mm camera model
 Olympus OM-1, a 1972 manually operated 35mm single-lens reflex camera
 M1 (TV channel), news channel of the Hungarian MTVA
 M-1 (Lithuanian radio station)
 M1 (Ukraine), a television channel

Economics and finance 
 M1 (money supply measure), in economics, a measure of the money supply
 M1 Finance, an online financial services company

Military equipment

Vehicles

US Armed Forces
 M1 Abrams, a main battle tank
 M1 Armored Car
 M1 Combat Car, an early tank
 M1 Light Tractor
 M1 Medium Tractor
 M1 Heavy Tractor

Other
 Bristol M.1, a 1916 British fighter aircraft
  (M1), a WWI Royal Navy monitor
  (1919), an early British submarine
 , a Swedish Navy mine sweeper
 , a Swedish Royal Navy mine layer

Weapons

US Armed Forces
 120 mm gun M1, an anti-aircraft gun
 20 mm aircraft gun M1 or French Hispano-Suiza HS.404
 240 mm howitzer M1, WWII
 37 mm gun M1, anti-aircraft
 40 mm automatic gun M1 or Swedish Bofors 40 mm Automatic Gun L/60
 57 mm gun M1, or British Ordnance QF 6-pounder
 76 mm gun M1, WWII
 8-inch gun M1, or M115 howitzer
 90 mm gun M1, dual-purpose gun
 M1 bayonet
 M1 carbine, WWII
 M1 chemical mine, WWII
 M1 flamethrower, WWII
 M1 frangible grenade, WWII
 M1 Garand, WWII rifle
 M1 helmet
 M1 mortar
 M1 rocket launcher "Bazooka", WWII rocket launcher
 M1 Thompson carbine
 M1 Thompson submachine gun
 M1 underwater defense gun, or Underwater Defense Gun Mark 1 Mod 0

Other
 35.5 cm Haubitze M1, a German WWII howitzer
 Benelli M1, a semi-automatic shotgun
 Guncrafter Industries M1 or Model No. 1, a handgun
 M1 (missile), French

Science and technology 
 the Crab Nebula, also known as Messier object M1
 ATC code M01 Anti-inflammatory and antirheumatic products, a subgroup of the Anatomical Therapeutic Chemical Classification System

Computing 
 a codename for Cyrix 6x86 processor
 M1-DA, M1, or VESA Plug and Display connector
 a part number for a 1N400x general-purpose diode
 Apple M1 system on a chip

Biology 
 Primary motor cortex or M1, a symbol of the primary motor cortex in mammals in neurology
 M1 protein, a matrix protein of the influenza virus
 Muscarinic acetylcholine receptor M1, a receptor in the human autonomic nervous system
 British NVC community M1, Sphagnum auriculatum bog pool community
 20-O-beta-D-glucopyranosyl-20(S)-protopanaxadiol, a ppd-type monoglucoside ginsenoside metabolized by intestinal bacteria
 M1 macrophage, a phenotype of macrophage

Medicine 
 Slang name for methylone

Roads and railways

Railways 
 Bucharest Metro Line M1, part of the Bucharest Metro, Romania
 Chesapeake and Ohio class M-1, a steam-turbine locomotive
 Line 1 (Budapest Metro), the first line of Budapest Metro, Hungary
 LNER Class M1, a class of British steam locomotives 
 M-1 Rail Line, now the QLine, streetcar service in Detroit
 M1 (Copenhagen), part of the city's Metro system, Denmark
 M1 (Istanbul Metro), a light railway system in Istanbul, Turkey
 M1 (Lausanne Métro), part of the Lausanne Metro in Switzerland
 M1 (Paris Métro), the first rolling stock on the Paris Metro in 1900
 M1 (İzmir Metro)
 M1/M3 (railcar), a series of electric multiple unit cars on the Long Island Rail Road and Metro-North Railroad
 Metro M1 (Prague), metro kit M1, which is used on line C of the Prague Metro
 Milan Metro Line 1
 PRR M1, a class of steam locomotive

Roads 

 M1 road (Australia), different sections of the A1 highway
 M1 (New South Wales)
 M1 (Queensland) 
 M1 (Victoria)
 Metroad 1, a road in Sydney, Australia
 M-1 (Michigan highway), a road in the United States that runs from Detroit northwesterly to Pontiac
 M1 highway (Belarus), a road connecting the border with Poland and the border with Russia
 M1 highway (Russia), a road connecting Moscow and the border with Belarus
M1 (East London), a Metropolitan Route in East London, South Africa
M1 (Johannesburg), a Metropolitan Route in Johannesburg, South Africa
M1 (Pretoria), a Metropolitan Route in Pretoria, South Africa
M1 (Durban), a Metropolitan Route in Durban, South Africa
M1 (Port Elizabeth), a Metropolitan Route in Port Elizabeth, South Africa
 M1 motorway (Hungary), a road connecting Budapest and Győr
 M1 motorway (Northern Ireland), a road connecting Belfast and Dungannon
 M1 motorway (Pakistan), a  road connecting Peshawar and Rawalpindi
 M1 motorway (Republic of Ireland), a road connecting Dublin to the border with Northern Ireland
 M1 motorway, a road in England connecting London and Leeds
 Highway M01 (Ukraine), a road connecting Kyiv and the border with Belarus
 M1 Road (Zambia)

Bus 
 Route M-1 (MTA Maryland), a bus route in Baltimore, Maryland and its suburbs
 M1 (New York City bus), a New York City Bus route in Manhattan

Vehicles 
 M1 category vehicle, a classification of passenger vehicles under the United Nations Economic Commission for Europe

Aviation and aerospace 
 M-1 (rocket engine), the largest liquid Hydrogen and LOx rocket engine ever built
 Martin M-1, glider
 Matteson M-1, glider
 Miles M.1 Satyr, a 1930s British single-seat aerobatic biplane
 Verville-Sperry M-1 Messenger - 1922

Automobiles 
 BMW M1, a German mid-engined sports car
 Great Wall Haval M1, a Chinese subcompact crossover
 Minardi M01, an Italian 1999 Formula One racing car
 Riich M1, a Chinese city car

Motorcycles 
 Yamaha YZR-M1, a Japanese motorcycle

Miscellaneous 
 M-1 Global or M-1 Mixfight, a mixed martial arts sports organization
 M-1 visa, a vocational training student visa for the USA
 M1 (Singaporean company), a telecommunications company in Singapore
 M1 World Championship, the first esports world championship for the mobile game Mobile Legends: Bang Bang held in 2019
 M1, a difficulty grade in mixed climbing

See also 
 Model 1 (disambiguation)
 1M (disambiguation)
 ML (disambiguation)
 MI (disambiguation)